Rudolf Karl González Vass (born 2 July 1998) is a professional footballer who plays as a winger for Bonner SC. Born in Germany, he represents the Dominican Republic national team.

International career
González was born in Germany to a Dominican father and a German mother. He is a youth international for Germany. He made his professional debut for the Dominican Republic national football team in a 1–0 friendly over win Guadeloupe on 15 February 2019.

Career statistics
Scores and results list the Dominican Republic's goal tally first, score column indicates score after each González goal.

References

External links
 
 
 

1998 births
Living people
People from Hennef (Sieg)
Sportspeople from Cologne (region)
Dominican Republic people of German descent
German people of Dominican Republic descent
Sportspeople of Dominican Republic descent
Dominican Republic footballers
German footballers
Footballers from North Rhine-Westphalia
Association football wingers
Dominican Republic international footballers
Germany youth international footballers
Regionalliga players
Oberliga (football) players
Luxembourg National Division players
US Mondorf-les-Bains players
FC St. Pauli II players
TuS Koblenz players
Dominican Republic expatriate footballers
German expatriate footballers
Dominican Republic expatriate sportspeople in Luxembourg
German expatriate sportspeople in Luxembourg
Expatriate footballers in Luxembourg